These are the results for the girls' K1 sprint event at the 2018 Summer Youth Olympics.

Results

Qualification

Repechages

Last 16

Quarterfinals

Semifinals

Finals

References
 Qualification Heats Results
 Repechages Results 
 Last 16 Results 
 Quarterfinals Results 
 Semifinals Results 
 Finals Results 

Canoeing at the 2018 Summer Youth Olympics